The men's javelin throw at the 2021 World Athletics U20 Championships was held at the Kasarani Stadium on 18 and 20 August.

Records

Results

Qualification
The qualification took place on 18 August, in two groups, with Group A starting at 16:13 and Group B starting at 17:09. Athletes attaining a mark of at least 73.00 metres ( Q ) or at least the 12 best performers ( q ) qualified for the final.

Final
The final was held on 20 August at 14:19.

References

Javelin throw
Javelin throw at the World Athletics U20 Championships